Doctors' Wives is a 1971 American drama film directed by George Schaefer and starring Dyan Cannon, Richard Crenna, Gene Hackman, Carroll O'Connor, Rachel Roberts, Janice Rule, Diana Sands and Cara Williams. It was based on a novel by Frank G. Slaughter.

The theme song, "The Costume Ball", was sung by Mama Cass Elliot.

Plot
While playing cards with her girlfriends, all of whom suspect their doctor husbands of having affairs, Lorrie Dellman volunteers to seduce each of them to find out more.

The plan backfires when Lorrie is caught in bed with Paul McGill by her husband, brain surgeon Dr. Mort Dellman, who shoots them both.

Dr. Pete Brennan is able to save McGill's life, but Lorrie is dead. Brennan is fed up with wife Amy and her migraines. He is having an affair with Helen, a nurse.

Dr. Dave Randolph is a psychiatrist. His wife, Della, is frigid. Randolph discovers that she's had a lesbian relationship with the late Lorrie.

Maggie, an alcoholic, is found face-down in her swimming pool by Dr. Joe Gray, her husband.

With all of their lives in turmoil, they attend Lorrie's funeral, where Helen reveals that her young son needs a brain operation. The doctors agree that Dr. Dellman is the man best suited to do the surgery, but Dellman is in jail for having shot his wife.

The district attorney, Douglas, agrees to release the surgeon for a few hours to perform the surgery, under a police guard. He is unaware that Dellman has made a deal with Lorrie's wealthy father, Jake Porter, to help him flee to Mexico as soon as the operation is done.

Cast
 Dyan Cannon as Lorrie Dellman
 Richard Crenna as Dr. Peter Brennan
 Gene Hackman as Dr. Dave Randolph
 Carroll O'Connor as Dr. Joe Gray
 Rachel Roberts as Della Randolph
 Janice Rule as Amy Brennan
 Diana Sands as Helen Struaghn
 Cara Williams as Maggie Gray
 Richard Anderson as Dist. Atty. Douglas
 Ralph Bellamy as Jake Porter
 George Gaynes as Paul McGill
 John Colicos as Dr. Mort Dellman
 Marian McCargo as Elaine McGill
 Scott Brady as Sgt. Malloy
 Kristina Holland as Sybil Carter
 Anthony Costello as Mike Traynor
 Mark Jenkins as Lew Saunders
 Vincent Van Lynn as Barney Harris
 Ernie Barnes as Dr. Perfield
 Paul Marin as Dr. Deemster
 William Bramley as Dr. Hagstrom
 Jon Lormer as Elderly Doctor

Reception

See also
 List of American films of 1971

References

External links
 
 
 

1971 films
1971 drama films
Adultery in films
American drama films
Columbia Pictures films
1970s English-language films
Films scored by Elmer Bernstein
Films based on American novels
Films directed by George Schaefer
Films set in California
Alcohol abuse in fiction
Female bisexuality in film
1970s American films